31st Union is a video game development studio of 2K based in San Mateo, California, with a studio in Valencia, Spain. It was founded in February 2019, then provisionally named 2K Silicon Valley, with Sledgehammer Games co-founder Michael Condrey as its lead.

2K announced in February 2020 that the studio was officially named 31st Union, a nod to its San Francisco Bay Area roots and based on California being the 31st state to join the United States. Condrey said in the announcement that the studio's ideals reflected the diversity of California's and Silicon Valley's spirit of innovation in art, technology, and entertainment and cultural representation. Condrey had committed to establishing the culture of this studio on its founding, calling it "a clean canvas", and stressed the importance of diversity in the creative process. In addition to the new branding, 2K also announced plans to open a second studio for 31st Union in Spain.

The current Silicon Valley studio, in addition to Condrey, includes several dozen former Call of Duty / Sledgehammer Games and Dead Space / Visceral Games developers. The studio, as of February 2020, was working on a "ambitious and inspired new IP", and which was to be revealed within 2020, according to 2K.

Michael Chu, previously the narrative director for Blizzard Entertainment's Overwatch, joined 31st Union in July 2020 as their narrative director.

On November 9, 2021, 2K acquired Elite3D, rebranding it as a 31st Union studio and a 2K Publishing arm.

References

External links 
 

2019 establishments in California
2K (company)
American companies established in 2019
Companies based in San Mateo, California
Take-Two Interactive divisions and subsidiaries
Video game companies based in California
Video game companies established in 2019
Video game development companies